Neotettix femoratus, known generally as the short-leg pygmy grasshopper or short-legged grouse locust, is a species of pygmy grasshopper in the family Tetrigidae. It is found in North America and Australia.

References

Tetrigidae
Articles created by Qbugbot
Insects described in 1869